Hyposmocoma papaiili is a species of moth of the family Cosmopterigidae. It is endemic to Maui.

The wingspan is 7.2–8.8 mm for males and 12.6 mm for females.

The larvae have been reared on lichen and fish food. The larvae live in a larval case which has the form of a crab-shaped structure with one entrance at each end. The combination of the color, irregular shape and texture of the case make them good mimics of small pieces of bark.

Etymology
The specific name is derived from the Hawaiian pāpa‘i (meaning crab)and ‘ili (meaning bark) and refers to the type of case and habitat of this species.

References

papaiili
Endemic moths of Hawaii
Moths described in 2011